Zelazo is a Polish language surname, which means the metal "iron" in Polish. The name may refer to:

Edward S. Zelazo (1924–2008), American politician
Helen Zelazo (1920–1996), American philanthropist
Nathaniel Zelazo (born 1918), American businessman
Philip David Zelazo (born 1966), American psychologist

See also
 
Zelazo (disambiguation)

References

Polish-language surnames